Alias Mr. Twilight is a 1946 crime drama film directed by John Sturges and starring Michael Duane, Trudy Marshall, and Lloyd Corrigan.

Plot

Cast
 Michael Duane as Tim Quaine
 Trudy Marshall as Corky Corcoran
 Lloyd Corrigan as Geoffrey Holden
 Gigi Perreau as Susan
 Rosalind Ivan as Elizabeth Christens
 Alan Bridge as Sam Havemayer
 Peter Brocco as Brick Robey

References

External links
 

Films directed by John Sturges
1946 crime drama films
1946 films
Films set in California
Columbia Pictures films
American crime drama films
American black-and-white films
1940s American films